Vitali Kazimirovich Gudiyev (born 22 April 1995) is a Russian football goalkeeper who plays for Khimki.

Club career

Alania
He made his debut in the FNL for FC Alania Vladikavkaz on 24 June 2011 in a game against FC Mordovia Saransk.

Terek
On 15 February 2014, Terek announced signing Gudiyev for four-and-a-half years.

Khimki
On 14 July 2022, Gudiyev signed a one-year contract with Khimki.

Personal life
He is the son of Kazemır Qudiyev.

Career statistics

References

External links
 

1995 births
Sportspeople from Vladikavkaz
Living people
Russian footballers
Russia youth international footballers
Russia under-21 international footballers
Association football goalkeepers
FC Spartak Vladikavkaz players
FC Akhmat Grozny players
FC Khimki players
Russian Premier League players
Russian First League players
Russian Second League players